The Do could refer to:

The Dø, a French / Finnish rock band
The DO, a magazine of the Osteopathic profession in the United States